Elizabeth Anderson may refer to:
Beth Anderson (composer) (born 1950), American composer
Beth Anderson (singer) (born 1954), American pop singer and voice actress
Betty Anderson, fictional character in the 1956 novel and subsequent 1960s US TV series Peyton Place
Betty Anderson, fictional character in the 1950s US TV series Father Knows Best
Betty Baxter Anderson (1908–1966), American author
Betty Lise Anderson, American electrical engineer
Lilly de Castella (born Elizabeth Anne Anderson), Australian colonist and winemaker
Bessie Anderson Stanley (1879–1952), American poet
Elizabeth Garrett Anderson (1836–1917), English physician and feminist, the first woman to gain a medical qualification in Britain
Liz Anderson (educator) (born 1970), Canadian educator and creator of the Accelerated Learning Framework
Liz Anderson (1927–2011), American singer-songwriter
Elizabeth Milbank Anderson (1850–1921), American philanthropist, advocate for public health and women's education
Elizabeth S. Anderson (born 1959), American philosopher
Betty Harvie Anderson, Baroness Skrimshire of Quarter  (1913–1979), British politician
PS Eliza Anderson (1858–1898), American paddle steamer